The Mulkhra or Mulkhura is a river in Mestia Municipality, Georgia,  right tributary of the Enguri.
Length , basin area . It originates on the southern slope of the Svaneti Caucasus main ridge, on the Tviberi Glacier and joins the Enguri River near the village Kvanchianari. Mulkhura feeds on glaciers, snow, rain and groundwater. Floods are known from April to October, and water shortages - from October to April, from late November to late March - on the ice and in Toshi.

References 

Rivers of Georgia (country)
Geography of Samegrelo-Zemo Svaneti